Sakania is a territory in the Haut-Katanga Province of the Democratic Republic of the Congo. Sakania Territory makes up the majority of the Congo Pedicle, a salient of the Democratic Republic of the Congo surrounded by Zambia. The seat of Sakania Territory is Sakania.

References

Territories of Haut-Katanga Province